Silke Van Avermaet (born 2 June 1999) is a Belgian volleyball player. She is part of the Belgium women's national volleyball team.

She competed at the 2015 FIVB Volleyball Girls' U18 World Championship, and 2018 FIVB Volleyball Women's Nations League. 
On club level she plays for ASPTT Mulhouse.

References

External links 
 http://volleymagazine.be/2018/04/28/rookie-van-het-jaar-silke-van-avermaet-debutant-bij-yellow-tigers/

1999 births
Living people
Belgian women's volleyball players
Place of birth missing (living people)
Liberos
21st-century Belgian women